Rebecca Calder is an English actress. Her films include Altar (2014), Love Me Do (2015), for which she won Best Actress at the European Independent Film Festival, and The Dark Mile (2017).

Early life
Calder was born in Consett, County Durham. She moved around growing up and was educated in New Zealand and Australia. At nineteen, she returned to England, moving from Naples, Italy to London where she now lives in Dalston.

Career
In 2007, Calder made her professional stage debut in Silver Birch House and Pera Palas, both at the Arcola Theatre in East London. This was followed by her television debut in four episodes of the BBC One medical drama Casualty the following year. She also appeared in Moonlight & Magnolias at the Tricycle Theatre. She made guest appearances in the third series of the ITV science fiction series Primeval as well as The Bill and Doctors, also on ITV and BBC One respectively.

Calder played Martha McCoy in the 2012 History miniseries Hatfields & McCoys and guest starred in an episode of the BBC Two drama White Heat. She made her feature film debut in the 2014 horror thriller Altar, which aired on Channel 5 in the United Kingdom and had a theatrical release elsewhere. She received critical acclaim for her performance alongside Jack Gordon in the 2015 film Love Me Do, for which she won Best Actress at the ÉCU European Independent Film Festival and the Cardiff Independent Film Festival. Calder would return to the ÉCU to sit on the jury in 2019.

Calder starred alongside Deirdre Mullins in the film The Dark Mile and portrayed Coco Chanel in the Picasso installment of the National Geographic anthology series Genius.

Calder had a recurring role as Shirley in Michaela Coel's BBC and HBO miniseries I May Destroy You. In 2022, Calder appeared in the action film Memory and the Swedish historical film Hilma. She is set to star in the horror film Sybil.

Filmography

Film

Television

Stage

Awards and nominations

Notes

References

External links
 

Living people
21st-century English actresses
Actors from County Durham
People from Consett